Maud Rosenbaum (January 13, 1902 – May 3, 1981) was an American track-and-field athlete and tennis player who won a bronze medal in the shot put at the 1922 Women's World Games. She was a naturalized Italian. Her name in her first marriage was Levi, and her name in her second marriage was Blumenthal

Biography
She was the daughter of a wealthy shoe manufacturer Emmanual Rosenbaum. In 1927, she married Baron Giacomo Giorgio Levi in Paris and later moved to Rome; the couple had a daughter. In Italy, Baroness Levi became a prominent tennis player, and in 1930, she returned to the United States to compete in tennis. By 1933. she won four tennis titles, including the New York State Tennis Championship. In 1934,  she was ranked the seventh female player by the U.S. Lawn Tennis Association. She divorced Baron Levi in 1934, and in 1935, she married H. Walter Blumenthal, a New York stockbroker.

References

1902 births
1981 deaths
American female shot putters
American female tennis players
Italian female tennis players
Jewish American sportspeople
Jewish tennis players
Naturalised citizens of Italy
Naturalised tennis players
Women's World Games medalists
20th-century American women
20th-century American Jews
American emigrants to Italy